The 1988 LPGA Tour was the 39th season since the LPGA Tour officially began in 1950. The season ran from February 4 to November 6. The season consisted of 34 official money events. Juli Inkster, Rosie Jones, Betsy King, Nancy Lopez, and Ayako Okamoto won the most tournaments, three each. Sherri Turner led the money list with earnings of $350,851.

There were eight first-time winners in 1988: Mei-Chi Cheng, Shirley Furlong, Patty Jordan, Ok-Hee Ku, Terry-Jo Myers, Martha Nause, Liselotte Neumann, and Sherri Turner. Ku was the first South Korean winner, winning the Standard Register Turquoise Classic.

The tournament results and award winners are listed below.

Tournament results
The following table shows all the official money events for the 1988 season. "Date" is the ending date of the tournament. The numbers in parentheses after the winners' names are the number of wins they had on the tour up to and including that event. Majors are shown in bold.

Awards

References

External links
LPGA Tour official site
1988 season coverage at golfobserver.com

LPGA Tour seasons
LPGA Tour